Frank or Frankie Byrne may refer to:

Frank M. Byrne (1858–1927), American politician
Frank Byrne (Irish nationalist) (1848–1894), an instigator of the Irish National Invincibles
Frank Byrne (Australian politician) (c. 1836–1923), NSW politician
Frank Byrne (rugby player), Ireland national rugby union player
Frankie Byrne (Gaelic footballer)  (1924–2019), played for Meath GAA
Frankie Byrne (EastEnders), fictional character
Frankie Byrne (broadcaster) (1922–1993), public relations consultant and broadcaster

See also
Francis Byrne (disambiguation)